Rogal may refer to:

Rogal, a Polish crescent roll similar to a kifli
Rogal świętomarciński, a crescent cake baked in Poznań, Poland for St. Martin's Day
Rogal, Greater Poland Voivodeship, a village in Kalisz County, Poland

See also
Rogale (disambiguation)
Rogala (disambiguation)
Rogalski (surname)
Hilb, Rogal & Hobbs Co., US insurance firm